Varanasi - Anand Vihar Terminal Garib Rath Express is a train between Varanasi and Anand Vihar Terminal of Delhi. A tri-weekly train that runs from Varanasi Junction on Sunday, Tuesday and Thursday as 22407 and from Anand Vihar Terminal on Monday, Wednesday and Friday as 22408.

The main towns along the route are Bhadohi, Pratapgarh, Amethi, Rae Bareli, Lucknow, Bareilly and Moradabad

Coach Composition
This train runs with 16 Garib Rath type AC III Tier Coaches and 2 Power Vans. From 9 January 2022, it will be running with LHB coaches, thus making it the first LHB Garib Rath Express of Indian Railways. The New Coach Composition will be 16 AC III Economy Coaches and 2 Generation Vans.

References

Passenger trains originating from Varanasi
Transport in Delhi
Garib Rath Express trains
Rail transport in Delhi